John Harris Kinzie (July 7, 1803 – June 19, 1865) was a prominent figure in Chicago politics during the 19th century. He served as the president of the Board of Trustees of Chicago when it was still a town and thrice unsuccessfully ran for Chicago's mayoralty once it was incorporated as a city.

Early life
Kinzie was born in Sandwich, Ontario, the eldest son of John Kinzie, one of Chicago's first permanent settlers. Kinzie arrived in Chicago with his parents when he was one year old.

The Kinzie family moved to Detroit, Michigan following the Battle of Fort Dearborn, living there for several years. However, the family returned to Chicago in 1816.

Life and career
From 1818 until 1823, Kinzie worked for the American Fur Company. He spent some time working for the governor of the Michigan Territory in the 1820s and became an Indian subagent at Fort Winnebago until he returned to Chicago in 1833.

In 1831, Kinzie was appointed by governor as the inaugural Cook County Sheriff.

In 1833, Kinzie signed the 1833 Treaty of Chicago as a witness. It became a controversy how much the Kinzie family financially benefited from the terms treaty, given their connection to George Bryan Porter, who had been one of the treaty's government-appointed negotiators.

On August 11, 1834 Kinzie became the second president of the Board of Trustees of the Town of Chicago.

On May 2, 1837 Kinzie ran against William Butler Ogden for mayor when Chicago became a city and lost. He subsequently made two more unsuccessful runs for mayor in 1845 and 1847.

In partnership with George W. Dole, Kinzie built the city's first steamboat.

In 1857 Kinzie was voted president of the Chicago Board of Underwriters.

Kinzie served as U.S. Army paymaster for Michigan, Wisconsin and Illinois troops in the Civil War

Death and legacy

Kinzie died suddenly while on a railroad train on June 21, 1865.

John H. Kinzie Elementary School in Chicago, Illinois is named after him.

The house he and his wife resided in for a short period at the end of his time as an Indian sub-agent, now known as the Old Indian Agency House, in Portage, Wisconsin, has been listed on the National Register of Historic Places.

Family
Kinzie's father was John Kinzie and his mother was Eleanor Lytle McKillip Kinzie.

Kinzie himself was married to historian and author Juliette Augusta Magill Kinzie. Together they had seven children. Three of their children died in either their infancy or youth, these being Alexander Wolcott (1833–1839), Julian Magill (born 1843, died at age six weeks), and Francis William (1844–1850, died of cholera). Four of their children survived into adulthood, these being Eleanor Lytle (1835–1917), John Harris Jr. (1838–1862), Capt. Arthur Magill (1841–1902), and George Herbert (1846–1890)

Kinzie's daughter Eleanor Lytle married William Washington Gordon II (the son of Savannah, Georgia mayor William Washington Gordon) with whom she had six children (including Juliette Gordon Low, founder of the Girl Scouts of the USA).

One of Kinzie's sons died fighting for the Union in the Civil War, two others were taken prisoner by Confederate forces but survived. His son-in-law William Washington Gordon III was a general in the Confederate Army.

Notes

External links
 
 

1803 births
1865 deaths
Politicians from Windsor, Ontario
Mayors of Chicago
People from Portage, Wisconsin
People of Illinois in the American Civil War
Pre-Confederation Canadian emigrants to the United States
United States Indian agents
Sheriffs of Cook County, Illinois